Since its transition to democracy in the late 1970s, Spain has been organized in a quasi-federal system called the "State of Autonomies". Each Autonomous Community is required by the Constitution to have its own three-branched system of government with its basic rules codified in a special law called a Statute of Autonomy, a sort-of regional constitution. Although there is no Constitutional requirement imposed upon regional elections other than that they must be based in proportional methods, all regional legislatures are unicameral, their members being elected in multi-member constituencies matching the provinces in the Autonomous Community with seats allocated to party lists using the D'Hondt method.

Autonomous Cities
The cities of Ceuta and Melilla are explicitly empowered by the Constitution to form Autonomous Communities on their own. Such provision was exercised by the respective City Councils in 1995, but not to its full extent: instead, the cities decided to adopt a regime between a normal city and a full-fledged Autonomous Community, with the main differences being:
 The Assemblies of Ceuta and Melilla assume all the powers of the old City Councils, with the new Mayor-President assuming the role of the old Mayor. In particular, meetings of the Assemblies are presided over by the President of the City instead of having a separate Speaker of the Parliament like most legislatures.
 Their legislatures are not allowed to pass primary legislation except on matters specifically allowed by the Spanish Cortes. Nevertheless, they are allowed to pass secondary legislation regarding matters far beyond the normal competences of cities in Spain.
 In compensation for not being able to pass their own primary legislation, Ceuta and Melilla can formally introduce legislation in the Spanish Cortes, a privilege not held by other cities, not even the capital Madrid.
 Elections to the cities' legislatures are fixed not to a certain date (like those of most Autonomous Communities), but to the date of the Spanish local elections. The writs are issued through a Royal Decree of the Spanish Government, while in all other Autonomous Communities (even in those with fixed election dates) it is the regional President who issues a decree dissolving the legislature and mandating elections to be held at the usually pre-fixed date.

Autonomous Communities
Except for Andalusia, the Basque Country, Catalonia and Galicia, which were created by a special fast procedure, most communities have very similar Statutes of Autonomy and election laws. Elections in those communities are fixed to a certain common date, which is currently "the fourth Sunday of May each four years", so regional Presidents cannot trigger a snap election nor select the final election date from a range of close dates. However, there have been occasions when the Speaker of the Legislative Assembly has been forced to call an out-of-sync election because the legislature was deadlocked in the President election. In those cases, the next election still takes place at the fixed common date, causing the new term out of the fresh elections to be shorter than normal: see President of Madrid#The 6th term scandal.

On the other hand, Presidents of communities created by the "fast procedure" can select the actual election date and trigger snap elections, and have frequently done so, particularly in the Basque Country and Catalonia. The Andalusian elections are usually set to coincide with the Spanish general elections, but again, there is no requisite to that effect in the Andalusian legislation.

References

 
Regional legislatures
Regional legislatures
Regional legislatures